His Excellency Amir e Paigah Basheerd-Ud-daula Azam-Ul-Umra Amir-e-Akbar Nawab Sir Muhammad Mazharuddin Khan Bahadur Rifa’at Jang   (1839 – 18 July 1898), commonly known as Sir Asman Jah or Nawab Sir Asman Jah Bahadur, Asman Jah was one of those fortunate individuals to whom it has been given by fate to write their names large in the annals of their country, he was an Indian noble and member of the Great Paigah Family who served as Prime Minister of Hyderabad from 1887 to 1894. As the grandson of the premier noble Fakhr Uddin Khan Shams-ul-Umra II and of a princess of the blood, his social position was a great one; but the personal qualities he possessed, inherited largely from his grandfather, were unquestionably the means of bringing him to the front. Singularly gifted by nature as far as the outward man was concerned and excelling in all manly pursuits, he easily took the lead among his peers. But it was his mental and moral equipment which attracted the notice of his royal master while yet the young noble was in early manhood. Such was the promise he showed that His Highness the Afzal-ud-Daulah gave him his daughter in marriage and bestowed on him the highest distinction in his gift, the title of Jah.in 1869, Asman Jah entered on his public career as Minister of Justice. A little later on, while still retaining the portfolio of Justice, he acted as Prime Minister and co-regent. Later still he became a Member of the Council of Regency, and finally in 1887 he was appointed Prime Minister and continued to hold the office till 1893. In this connection it may be noted that throughout his long official career, Sir Asman Jah refused to take any salary while willing to take office he steadily persisted im refusing the emoluments of office. Elis regime as Premier was marked by several reforms, notably the advance made in education, the extension of medical aid by the State, especially aid to women, and the establishment of a permanent Board of Irrigation and city water supply, which has since been of excellent service to the State, Asman Jah was still in London when he got the news of his having been-appointed Prime Minister and one of the first to congratulate him on his appointment was his late Majesty King Edward VIL, then Prince of Wales, Asman Jah built several architectures through out the city like Asman Garh Palace, Basheer Bagh Palace, saroonagar palace and Mahboob Chowk Clock Tower. Just before he was appointed to the premiership he was deputed by His Highness the late Nizam, Mahboob Ali Khan, to proceed in 1887 to London as his representative at the Golden Jubilee of Her late Majesty Queen Victoria. While in England he won golden opinions by the tact, savoir faire and high breeding he displayed His handsome presence, imposing address and polished manners impressed all classes of English Society and he became a great favourite in court circles. Indeed, the late Nizam could not have had a more dignified or worthier representative.

Early life and ancestry
Asman Jah was born as Mazharuddin Khan in 1839, although his exact date of birth is not recorded. His biological father Sultanuddin Khan was the third son of Fakhruddin Khan. After Sultanuddin's death, Asman Jah was adopted by his uncle Rafiuddin Khan Shams-ul-Umra III. Jah's maternal grandmother was Bashirunnisa Begum, a daughter of Nizam Nizam Ali Khan.

Asman Jah was a member of the noble Paigah family which was hierarchically second to the Nizam of Hyderabad. The members of the family were staunch Nizam loyalists. The family descends from the Second Rashidun caliph Umar Sufi saint Fariduddin Ganjshakar is also an ancestor of the family. One of Jah's ancestor Muhammad Abu’l Khair Khan was a mansabdar during Mughal emperor Aurangzeb's reign. Jah's cousin Viqar-ul-Umra also served as Prime Minister of Hyderabad.

Political career
In 1869, Asman Jah was appointed as Minister for Justice and served in that position until 1888. After the death of Sir Salar Jung I in 1883, Jah was made a member of the Council of Regency. He also went on to become the administrator of the Hyderabad State during the Nizam's visit to Kolkata during the same year.

In 1887, Nizam Mahbub Ali Khan chose Jah to represent him at the Golden Jubilee celebration of Queen Victoria held at the Windsor Castle. After returning from England, he was appointed Prime Minister of the state. He was replaced by his cousin Viqar-ul-Umra in 1894.

later, on the occasion of Her Majesty’s Diamond Jubilee, the late Queen Empress again marked her appreciation of Sir Asman Jah and her recognition of the good work he had put in both as Councillor and as Prime Minister, as well as her recollection of his engaging personality and staunch loyalty, by bestowing on him the high honour of a K.C.I.E

Architecture
Jah built the Mahboob Chowk Clock Tower in 1892. The clock tower had clocks on its four sides and was constructed in the middle of a garden. Jah also constructed the Asmah Garh Palace in 1885 at the top of a hillock in Hyderabad. It was built in the Gothic architecture style and had pointed arches supported by Corinthian pillars. Jah's brother-in-law and Nizam Mahbub Ali Khan enjoyed living in the palace and he later gifted it to the Nizam. The building presently houses the St. Joseph's Public School.

Personal life
Jah was married to Parwarishunnisa Begum, the daughter of the fifth Nizam Tahniyath Ali Khan. They had one son Moin-Ud-Dowlah Bahadur who was born in 1891. Jah died at Basheer Bagh Palace on 16 July 1898 and is buried at Paigah Tombs. Jah brought up cricketer Syed Mohammad Hadi after his father died. Hadi scored the first-ever century in the Ranji Trophy.

Asmah Jah's full name with titles is Asmah Jah, Amir-i-Akbar, Azam-ul-Umra, Umdat-ul-Mulk, Bashir-ud-Daulah, Nawab Sir Muhammad Mazharuddin Khan Bahadur, Rifat Jung KCIE.

References

Sources

External links
Sir Asman Jah photos

Politicians from Hyderabad, India
Indian Muslims
Prime Ministers of Hyderabad State
1839 births
1898 deaths
Knights Commander of the Order of the Indian Empire